The 1913 International Lawn Tennis Challenge was the 12th edition of what is now known as the Davis Cup. With Great Britain's win in 1912, the competition returned to Europe for the first time in five years. This prompted several new teams to join the competition, creating the largest field to date. The first round tie between Germany and France, played at Wiesbaden, Germany was the first Davis Cup tie to be played on clay courts, or any surface other than grass. The United States would triumph in the final, which was played at Worple Road in Wimbledon, London, England on 25–28 July.

Teams
Canada, Germany, and South Africa all competed for the first time. Belgium returned for the first time since 1904.

Draw

Quarterfinals
United States vs. Australasia

Germany vs. France

Canada vs. South Africa

Semifinals
United States vs. Germany

Canada vs. Belgium

Final

Challenge Round
Great Britain vs. United States

References

External links
Davis Cup official website

Davis Cups by year
International Lawn Tennis Challenge
International Lawn Tennis Challenge